Hesperanoplium notabile is a species of beetle in the family Cerambycidae. It was described by Knull in 1947.

References

Hesperophanini
Beetles described in 1947